Adolf Pietrasiak (17 November 191629 November 1943) was a Polish fighter ace of the Polish Air Force in World War II with 8 confirmed kills and one shared.

Biography
Adolf Pietrasiak was born in Kośmin near Puławy.  In 1932 he entered the Air Force Non-Commissioned Officer's School for minors in Bydgoszcz. Four years later he was assigned to Polish 122nd Fighter Escadrille in Cracow.

During the Invasion of Poland, on 6 September 1939 Pietrasiak's PZL P.11 was damaged by his own side's anti-aircraft guns. On the morning of 18 September he crossed the border with Romania, then he came to France. He served in the Kosiński section in Bourges. On 5 June 1940, flying a Curtiss P-36 Hawk, Pietrasiak claimed three victories shared.

On 27 June 1940 he arrived in the UK and was posted to No. 303 Polish Fighter Squadron then to No. 92 Squadron RAF. In July 1941 he downed seven Bf 109. On 23 July he was transferred to No. 308 Polish Fighter Squadron. On 19 August he was shot down over France, landing by parachute he injured his leg. He came back to England via Spain and Gibraltar in November. From 24 August 1942 he flew in No. 317 Polish Fighter Squadron.
 
On 29 November 1943 Pietrasiak took off in a Spitfire and never came back. His plane probably crashed in the English Channel. His body was never found.

Awards
 Virtuti Militari, Silver Cross 
 Cross of Valour (Poland)
 Distinguished Flying Medal

References

Further reading
 Tadeusz Jerzy Krzystek, Anna Krzystek: Polskie Siły Powietrzne w Wielkiej Brytanii w latach 1940-1947 łącznie z Pomocniczą Lotniczą Służbą Kobiet (PLSK-WAAF). Sandomierz: Stratus, 2012, p. 449. 
 
 . 
 
 
 

The Few
Polish World War II flying aces
Recipients of the Silver Cross of the Virtuti Militari
Recipients of the Cross of Valour (Poland)
1943 deaths
1916 births
Polish military personnel killed in World War II
Recipients of the Distinguished Flying Medal